Beatrix Charlotte Dobie (1887-1944) was a New Zealand landscape artist, most known for her illustrations in the work of conservationist Herbert Guthrie Smith.

Dobie was born in Whangarei, New Zealand in 1887. Her father was Herbert Boucher Dobbie, New Zealand amateur botanist and photographer, and her aunt was Mary Dobie, . In 1911 she moved to London to study at the Slade School of Art, under Henry Tonks.

During the First World War she volunteered with her sister Agatha to become a British Red Cross VAD (a volunteer nurse aide ) and was stationed in Malta and worked at a canteen near the No. 3 New Zealand General Hospital near Codford, England.

After the war she returned to live in New Zealand, exhibiting her work at the Canterbury Society of Arts Gallery. During this period she met Herbert Guthrie-Smith and formed the connection that would lead to her providing the illustrations for his book Tutira: the story of a New Zealand sheep station.

In 1926 she toured Africa where she met her future husband, Rene Vernon, an engineer in the French Army. They settled in Tunisia where Dobie continued to paint. She sent her artwork to be exhibited in the Empire Exhibition in 1937.

She died in Tunisia in 1944. Her death was reported in New Zealand in the Auckland Star and Evening Post. The Post described her as a 'notable New Zealand artist' who had held 'an unusual and varied career.' She is known for her post-impressionist paintings of New Zealand landscapes and specifically, horses.

References 

20th-century New Zealand artists
New Zealand women artists
1887 births
1944 deaths
Alumni of the Slade School of Fine Art
People from Whangārei
People associated with the Canterbury Society of Arts